Jean-Paul Brigger (born 14 December 1957) is a Swiss football manager and former player who played as a football striker. He played for the most of his career with FC Sion.

Aside from FC Sion, Brigger played for Servette and represented the Swiss national team. After retiring, he had a spell managing FC Sion and FC Luzern.

Since 1999, he has worked for FIFA as a member of its technical study and development group.

Honours
 Swiss National League - 1984–85, 1991–92
 Swiss Cup - 1979–80, 1981–82, 1983–84, 1985–86, 1990–91
 Swiss National League Top Scorer - 1982-83
 Swiss Footballer of the Year - 1991-92

External links
 
 

1957 births
Living people
Swiss men's footballers
Switzerland international footballers
Association football forwards
FC Sion players
Servette FC players
Swiss football managers
FC Luzern managers
FC Sion managers
People from Visp (district)
Sportspeople from Valais